Ottavia Cestonaro (born 12 January 1995) is an Italian long jumper and triple jumper.

Biography
She has won five times her country's senior national championship, and ranked in the top 60, at 33rd place, on the IAAF world leading list at the end of the 2017 indoor season. She also won an individual gold medal at junior level at the 2013 European Athletics Junior Championships held in Rieti.

She is currently engaged to the rugby union player Marco Zanon.

Progression

Triple jump outdoor

Triple jump indoor

Achievements

National titles
She has won 6 times the individual national championship.

Italian Athletics Championships
Triple jump (2015, 2018, 2019)
Italian Athletics Indoor Championships
Triple jump (2018)
Pentathlon (2016, 2017)

See also
 Italian all-time lists - Triple jump

References

External links

1995 births
Living people
Italian female pentathletes
Italian heptathletes
Italian female long jumpers
Italian female triple jumpers
Sportspeople from Vicenza
Athletics competitors of Centro Sportivo Carabinieri
Athletes (track and field) at the 2018 Mediterranean Games
Mediterranean Games silver medalists for Italy
Mediterranean Games medalists in athletics
Italian Athletics Championships winners
Competitors at the 2017 Summer Universiade
Competitors at the 2019 Summer Universiade
21st-century Italian women